"Clean My Wounds" is a song by American heavy metal band Corrosion of Conformity. It was released as the third single from the band's fourth studio album Deliverance. Written by lead vocalist/guitarist Pepper Keenan, "Clean My Wounds" was a hit on rock radio, peaking at No. 19 on the Billboard Mainstream Rock chart, the band's highest charting single along with "Albatross" (which also peaked at No. 19).

The B-side "Big Problems" originally appeared on the soundtrack for the 1994 film Clerks.

Track listing
American single

European single

Live performances
The song has been played live 239 times, making it the band's second-most-performed song; only "Vote with a Bullet" has been played live more with 271 performances. A live version of "Clean My Wounds" appears on the 2001 release Live Volume.

Use in other media
The song's music video was featured in the Beavis and Butt-Head episode "Vidiots". "Clean My Wounds" was featured in the English dub of the 1998 OVA/film Tekken: The Motion Picture.

Personnel
 Pepper Keenan – vocals, rhythm guitar
 Woody Weatherman – lead guitar
 Mike Dean – bass
 Reed Mullin – drums

References

External links
 Official music video on YouTube

1994 songs
1995 singles
Columbia Records singles
Corrosion of Conformity songs